Aasha is a 1957 Indian Hindi-language romantic comedy film directed by M. V. Raman. It stars Kishore Kumar and Vyjayanthimala. The film was a critical and commercial success. This film was partly coloured by both Gevacolor and Technicolor. The film was remade in Tamil as Athisaya Penn. Asha Parekh appears in the song 'Chal Chal Re Kanhai' and one scene after it with Vyjayanthimala.

Plot 
The story is about Kishore who is a good-hearted person and always helps poor people even though he is from a rich Zamindar (property owner) family. One day, he travels to Bombay to stay with his cousin Raj, who cheats a lot with girls. When they both go for a hunt in the jungle, Raj meets a man who demands he marry his jilted daughter. Raj murders the father and he frames Kishore for the crime. Kishore is forced to flee. Finally, Kishore and his lover Nirmala prove that Raj is the guilty one, and Raj tells the truth in front of everyone. Now the police arrest Raj and Kishore marries Nirmala amid happy celebrations.

Cast 
 Kishore Kumar as Kishore
 Vyjayanthimala as Nirmala
 Pran as Raj
 Om Prakash as Hasmukhlal
 Minoo Mumtaz as Munni
 Lalita Pawar as Durga

Soundtrack 
The music was composed by C. Ramchandra and the lyrics were written by Rajendra Krishan. The song "Eena Meena Deeka", sung by Kishore Kumar and Asha Bhosle  in two different versions, became very popular. It was one of the Hindi cinema's first rock and roll numbers. The words of the song were inspired by children playing outside C. Ramchandra's music room. The children were chanting "Eeny, meeny, miny, moe", which inspired C. Ramchandra and his assistant John Gomes to create the first line of the song, "Eena Meena Deeka, De Dai Damanika". Gomes, who was a Goan, added the words "Maka Naka" (Konkani for "I don't want"). They kept on adding more nonsense rhymes till they ended with "Rum Pum Posh!". It was later covered by Timid Tiger and Goldspot. Eastern Eye magazine declared Kishore Kumar's version of "Eena Meena Deeka" as one of his top 10 best songs.

Use in media 
An advertising campaign by the JWT agency of London for the UK bank HSBC in October 2008 used the "Eena Meena Deeka" song from the film as background music.

References

External links 
 

1950s Hindi-language films
1957 films
1957 romantic comedy films
Films directed by M. V. Raman
Films scored by C. Ramchandra
Hindi films remade in other languages
Indian romantic comedy films